Asinus is a subgenus of Equus (single-toed (hooved) grazing animal) that encompasses several subspecies of the Equidae commonly known as wild asses, characterized by long ears, a lean, straight-backed build, lack of a true withers, a coarse mane and tail, and a reputation for considerable toughness and endurance.

The common donkey is the best-known domesticated representative of the subgenus, with both domesticated and feral varieties.  Among the wild ass species, several never-domesticated species live in Asia and Africa.

Taxonomy 
 Genus: Equus
 Subgenus: Asinus
 African wild ass, Equus africanus
 Nubian wild ass, Equus africanus africanus
 Somali wild ass, Equus africanus somaliensis
 Atlas wild ass, †Equus africanus atlanticus (extinct)
 Donkey, Equus africanus asinus
Onager or Asiatic wild ass, Equus hemionus
 Mongolian wild ass or khulan, Equus hemionus hemionus
 Indian wild ass or khur, Equus hemionus khur
 Turkmenian kulan, Equus hemionus kulan
 Persian onager or gur, Equus hemionus onager
 Syrian wild ass or achdari, †Equus hemionus hemippus (extinct)
 European wild ass or hydruntine, †Equus hemionus hydruntinus (extinct)
 Kiang or Tibetan wild ass, Equus kiang
 Western kiang, Equus kiang kiang
 Eastern kiang, Equus kiang holdereri
 Southern kiang, Equus kiang polyodon
 Northern kiang, Equus kiang chu

References

External links
 

 
Equus (genus)
Animal subgenera